Michael O'Shea (born Edward Francis Michael Patrick Joseph O'Shea; March 17, 1906 – 1973) was known as an American actor who appeared in feature films and later in television and whose career spanned the 1940s, 1950s, and 1960s.

Early life
O'Shea dropped out of school at 12 and began his acting career in vaudeville by touring with boxing idol Jack Johnson's show. He did a variety of jobs including soda jerk, bricklayer, private detective and bodyguard.

Career
O'Shea played drums and the banjo. Much like his character from Lady of Burlesque (1943), Biff Brannigan, O'Shea was a comedian and emcee at speakeasies. He put together his own dance band, "Michael O'Shea and His Stationary Gypsies", and later broke into radio and the "legitimate" stage, where he was billed for a time as "Eddie O'Shea". He worked on radio shows such as Superman, Mr District Attorney, The March of Time and Gangbuster.

O'Shea received acclaim for his performance in the 1942 play The Eve of St. Mark on Broadway. The play was a hit and film producers began approaching O'Shea to do screen tests.

Early films
O'Shea's work in Eve led to him being offered to play Barbara Stanwyck's leading man in the film Lady of Burlesque (1943) for producer Hunt Stromberg, released through United Artists. It was a sizeable hit.

Samuel Bronston offered him the title role in the biopic Jack London (1943), also released through United Artists. The cast included Virginia Mayo who would become O'Shea's second wife.

O'Shea was asked to reprise his stage role in the film version of The Eve of St. Mark (1944), produced by 20th Century Fox. That studio contracted him to make two more films. Fox announced they would make Where Do We Go From Here? with him and Stanley Prager, also in Eve, but it appears to have not been made.

He had the lead role in Man from Frisco (1944), a fictional account of the career of Henry Kaiser for Republic Pictures, directed by Robert Florey. At Fox he made a musical, Something for the Boys (1944), with Carmen Miranda.

O'Shea then went into It's a Pleasure! (1945), playing a hockey star who marries figure skater Sonja Henie, done for International Pictures. Back at Fox he had the lead in a B, Circumstantial Evidence (1945).

Return to Broadway
O'Shea returned to Broadway with a role in the revival of The Red Mill (1945–47), produced by Hunt Stromberg Jr. which ran for 531 performances.

Supporting actor in film
When the show finished he returned to films. He had a support part with Mr. District Attorney (1947) at Columbia.

He was Nancy Coleman's leading man in Violence (1947) at Monogram Pictures and played Natty Bumpo in Sam Katzman's version of Last of the Mohicans, Last of the Redmen (1947), with Jon Hall at Columbia.

He had a support role in Smart Woman (1948), at Allied Artists, and the lead in Parole, Inc. (1949), for Eagle-Lion Films.

He supported Mickey Rooney in The Big Wheel (1949) at United Artists but had the lead in The Threat (1949) a "B" for RKO.

O'Shea supported John Payne in Captain China (1950) and Dan Duryea in The Underworld Story (1950). He had a support role in Disc Jockey (1951), then did three films at Fox: Fixed Bayonets (1951) for Sam Fuller, The Model and the Marriage Broker (1951) for George Cukor, and Bloodhounds of Broadway (1952).

Television
After his career in film waned - he was largely out of films by 1952 — he took many roles in television. He acted in TV programs such as The Revlon Mirror Theater, Ethel Barrymore Theatre, Damon Runyon Theater, and Schlitz Playhouse of Stars.

He had a support part in It Should Happen to You (1954).

It's a Great Life
He also starred in the NBC sitcom It's a Great Life from 1954-1956 as Denny Davis, a former GI trying to find a civilian job. Frances Bavier played his landlady. He won an Emmy in 1954 but quit the show in 1957.

He worked as a panelist on TV shows and filmed a pilot for a TV sitcom with his wife Virginia Mayo, McGarry and His Mouse (1960) but it was not picked up for a series. He guest starred on episodes of Adventures in Paradise, Daktari and Adam-12. In 1964 he returned briefly to New York stage in a production I Was Dancing.

Personal life
He was married twice. His first wife was Grace Watts, by whom he had two children. That marriage ended in divorce in 1947. 

His second wife was actress Virginia Mayo, whom he married in 1947, and to whom he stayed married until his death from a heart attack in 1973. He met Mayo during the filming of Jack London in 1943. They subsequently appeared on the stock stage together in such productions as George Washington Slept Here, Tunnel of Love and Fiorello!. When he died of a heart attack he was in Dallas, about to go on tour with his wife in a production of Forty Carats.

During their marriage, they had one child, Mary Catherine O'Shea, who was born in 1953. That year O'Shea's first wife sued him for unpaid alimony.

A Republican, he supported Dwight Eisenhower's campaign in the 1952 presidential election.

In 1957 he pleaded guilty to discharging a firearm. In August of 1959, he was arrested after brandishing a pistol in a Philadelphia restaurant following an argument between his wife and another customer over the air conditioning. O'Shea was of the Catholic faith.

Other employment
O'Shea kept up his bricklayer's card and was a reserve deputy sheriff in the Ventura County Sheriff's Office

Partial filmography

Lady of Burlesque (1943)
Jack London (1943)
Something for the Boys (1944)
Man from Frisco (1944) – Matt Braddock
The Eve of St Mark (1944)
Circumstantial Evidence (1945)
It's a Pleasure (1945)
Last of the Redmen (1947)
Violence (1947)
 Mr. District Attorney (1947)
Parole, Inc. (1948)
Smart Woman (1948)
The Threat (1949)
The Big Wheel (1949)
The Underworld Story (1950)
Captain China (1950)
The Model and the Marriage Broker (1951)
Fixed Bayonets! (1951)
Disc Jockey (1951)
Bloodhounds of Broadway (1952)
It Should Happen to You (1954)

References

External links

 
 
 

1906 births
1973 deaths
American male film actors
American male stage actors
American male television actors
Male actors from Connecticut
Vaudeville performers
20th-century American male actors
Connecticut Republicans
California Republicans
American Roman Catholics
American people of Irish descent